Sapna Maheshwari is an American journalist. Currently, she is a business reporter for The New York Times.

Life and career
Maheshwari, an Indian American, was born in Mystic, Connecticut. She graduated from the University of North Carolina.

She covered e-commerce and retail for BuzzFeed from 2013 to 2016, prior to which she had worked for Bloomberg Businessweek. In 2015, Maheshwari won a Front Page Award for her article "Making Victoria's Secret Pay For Keeping Staff On Call". At the same year she won "Investigative, Division 2" award from the Society of American Business Editors and Writers for her article "The Dark, Scammy History of JustFab and Fabletics".

In 2016, she joined The New York Times as its business reporter.

See also
 Business journalism
 Indians in the New York City metropolitan region
 New Yorkers in journalism

References

Year of birth missing (living people)
Living people
People from Mystic, Connecticut
American business and financial journalists
The New York Times writers